Ain Qana, also known as Ainqana, is a town in the Nabatieh Governorate, Southern Lebanon.
The town is situated 680 meters above sea level, has an area of 630 hectares and a population of approximately 5585. The economy is mostly based on agriculture.

References

 Discover Lebanon
 "History of AinQana" by Safi Habhab

External links
 Official web page
 Ain Qana, Localiban

Populated places in Nabatieh District